The montane racket-tail (Prioniturus montanus) or the Luzon racket-tail, is a species of parrot in the family Psittaculidae.
It was previously conspecific with the Mindanao racket-tail. It is endemic to the mountains of northern Luzon in the Philippines. It is threatened by habitat loss and the cage bird trade.

Description and Taxonomy 
EBird describes the bird as "A medium-sized parrot of montane forest on Luzon. The two central tail feathers have extended shafts ending in a racket shape. Overall green in color, darker on the back and paler below. Male has a blue face and a red crown. The similar Green racket-tail may overlap geographically, but Luzon is usually found at higher elevations and has a darker back. Voice includes various grating calls and shrill squeals.

Exhibits sexual dimorphism in which males have a blueish crown with a bright red spot with the females having a green head with a very light blue tinge.

It eats berries, seeds and nuts. 

Breeding occurs in August to September. Like all other Racket-tails, they are cavity nesters.

Habitat and Conservation Status 
It inhabits tropic moist montane forest at 700–2,900 meters above sea level. Has been to known to visit cultivated areas.

IUCN has assessed this bird as near threatened with its population being estimated as 1,500 to 7,000 mature individuals. . Forest loss is a threat but it is not thought to have as significant impact within this species's alititudinal range as compared to lowland forest. Its lowland counterpart the Green racket-tail is considered much more threatened being listed as endangered with many local extinctions.  Many parrots in the region are affected by trapping for trade, but its impacts upon this species are not known.

It is recommended to gather data on the impacts of international and national trade. Undergo surveys to have a better population estimate. Calculate rates of forest loss within its altitudinal and geographic range using satellite imagery and remote sensing techniques. Effectively protect habitat at key sites,

References

montane racket-tail
Birds of Luzon
montane racket-tail
Taxonomy articles created by Polbot